Ark Burlington Danes Academy is a Church of England non-selective, mixed all-through school located in White City, London on a  site.

The school is funded by the Department for Education and operated by Ark schools, a registered charity under English law, and sponsored by parent charity Ark.

History
Ark Burlington Danes Academy traces its origins to two separate schools, Burlington Church of England School for Girls founded in 1699 and St Clement Danes Grammar School for boys, founded in 1562, both originally situated in Westminster. Following a decision by the trustees of the St Clement Danes Holborn Estate Charity, St Clement Danes Grammar School relocated from Ducane Road, Hammersmith to Chorleywood, Hertfordshire, and a new school — Burlington Danes a Church of England School — was formed on its old site in 1976.

In September 2015 opened a primary school and became an all-through school. In 2017, in the immediate aftermath of the Grenfell Tower fire, the school provided accommodation to students from the Kensington Aldridge Academy who had been traumatised and displaced.

Buildings
The school has one of the largest school sites in central London, with its 10 acre site including a number of facilities such as a purpose built theatre and performing arts centre, the Dennis Potter Building (named after the playwright who was an alumnus of St Clement Danes School). The school consists of a large listed brick building attached to the main hall of the school. It was designed by Frederick MacManus of Burnet, Tait and Lorne (architects) in 1936.  On the other side the building is joined to a more recent technology and art building which is joined to a ground floor building for PE which is attached to a large sports hall. On the opposite of the site there is a new building opened in 2008. The building consists of science laboratories, maths and English classes. The site also includes a large field with grass pitches for rugby, football and cricket.  A third generation astroturf football pitch was added in 2010. In 2012 a state of the art gym was fitted in the Stanley Fink building.

Architects

The school was designed by the office of Sir John Burnet, Thomas Tait & Lorne and there is good evidence to show that the Irish born architect Frederick Edward Bradshaw McManus (1903-1985) who had studied modern architecture in France and Holland prior to joining John Burnet & Partners in 1927 and worked on the design of the school prior to its completion in 1936. The architects were working for the school Governor, Ruth Dalton. McManus had already designed and built a modern house at West Leaze, Aldbourne for Dr. and Mrs. Hugh Dalton.

Notable former pupils

 Sharon Blyfield , head of early careers at The Coca Cola Company
 Wasfi Kani, founder of Pimlico and Grange Park Operas
 D. J. Campbell, Footballer
 Coreé Richards, R&B singer
 Cherise Roberts, singer/songwriter
 Noel Clarke, Actor, writer, producer & director
 Shireen Benjamin, Former Miss West Africa, Model, Journalist/ Fashion & lifestyle blogger
 Simon Mensing, Footballer
 Andy Fraser, bass guitarist with Free and singer
 Dennis Potter, playwright
 Frank Field, MP
 Danny Dichio, Footballer

See also
 List of schools in Hammersmith and Fulham
 Dame Kitty Anderson

References

External links
 Ark schools website
 Burlington Danes Academy website

Academies in the London Borough of Hammersmith and Fulham
Church of England secondary schools in the Diocese of London
Secondary schools in the London Borough of Hammersmith and Fulham
Ark schools
White City, London
Primary schools in the London Borough of Hammersmith and Fulham
Grade II listed educational buildings
Grade II listed buildings in the London Borough of Hammersmith and Fulham